White Coat Rebels is an 2021 American documentary film directed and produced by Greg Barker. It follows corruption of Big Pharma, and its influence on doctors.

The film had its world premiere at AFI Docs on June 24, 2021.

References

External links
 

2021 films
2021 documentary films
American documentary films
Participant (company) films
Films directed by Greg Barker
2020s English-language films
2020s American films